Lewis Grover "Sam" Lanford (January 8, 1886 – September 14, 1970) was a pitcher in Major League Baseball. He played for the Washington Senators in 1907.

References

External links

1886 births
1970 deaths
Major League Baseball pitchers
Washington Senators (1901–1960) players
Baseball players from South Carolina
Orangeburg Edistoes players
People from Woodruff, South Carolina